Contamana Airport , is an airport serving the Ucayali River town of Contamana, in the Loreto Region of Peru.

Airlines and Destinations

See also

Transport in Peru
List of airports in Peru

References

External links
OpenStreetMap - Contamana
OurAirports - Contamana
SkyVector Aeronautical Charts

Airports in Peru
Buildings and structures in Loreto Region